Stenus sculptilis is a species of beetle family Staphylinidae. It is found in western North America.

References

Further reading

 

Steninae
Articles created by Qbugbot